The Anfiteatro de Ticó Formation is a geological formation from the Deseado Massif in the province of Santa Cruz, Argentina.

Paleobiology 
The Anfiteatro de Ticó preserves a rich and diverse flora including macrofossils, mesofossils, and microfossils. These have been object of detailed investigations since the 1960'.

Depositional environments 
The formation is of continental origin, and includes riparian and lacustrine deposits.

Fossil content 
The following fossils were reported from the formation:

Flora 
Bryophytes
 Ricciopsis grandensis

Horsetails
 Equisetites pusillus

Ferns

 Cladophlebis tripinnata
 Cladophlebis antarctica
 Cyathea cyathifolia
 Baqueroites padulae
 Adiantopteris tripinnata
 Korallipteris vegagrandis

Conifers

 Alkastrobus peltatus
 Apterocladus lanceolatus
 Morenostrobus fertilis
 Podocarpus dubius
 Squamastrobus tigrensis
 Tarphyderma glabra
 Tomaxellia degiustoi
 Tomaxellia biforme
 Trisacocladus tigrensis

Ginkgoales

 Ginkgoites tigrensis
 Ginkgoites ticoensis
 Allicospermum patagonicum
 Karkenia incurva

Cycadales

 Restrepophyllum  chiguoides
 Eobowenia incrassata
 Sueria rectivervis
 Mesosingeria coriacea 
 Mesosingeria oblonga
 Ticoa harrisii
 Ticoa lanceolata
 Ticoa magnipinnulata
 Pseudoctenis crassa
 Pseudoctenis dentata

Caytoniales

 Ruflorinia sierra
 Ruflorinia pilifera
 Ruflorinia papillosa
 Ktalenia circularis

References 

Geologic formations of Argentina
Lower Cretaceous Series of South America
Cretaceous Argentina
Aptian Stage
Sandstone formations
Siltstone formations
Lacustrine deposits
Paleontology in Argentina
Geology of Santa Cruz Province, Argentina
Geology of Patagonia